The South Africa A cricket team toured India to play two first-class matches against the India A. The two first-class matches were played at Wayanad.

Squads

Test Series
1st Unofficial Test

2nd Unofficial Test

References 

A team cricket
2015 in Indian cricket